The Armenia men's national under-16 basketball team is a national basketball team of Armenia, administered by the Basketball Federation of Armenia. It represents the country in international men's under-16 basketball competitions.

On 27 July 2007, in the first game of the Division B of the FIBA Europe Championship, Armenia was defeated by Bosnia and Herzegovina  by 236–27, becoming this game as one of the highest margin wins ever in any international game.

The team won two medals at the FIBA U16 European Championship Division C.

FIBA U16 European Championship participations

See also
Armenia men's national basketball team
Armenia men's national under-18 basketball team
Armenia women's national under-16 basketball team

References

External links
Archived records of Armenia team participations

Basketball in Armenia
Armenia national basketball team
Basketball
Men's national under-16 basketball teams